The helmet jellyfish (Periphylla periphylla) is a luminescent, red-colored jellyfish of the deep sea, belonging to the order Coronatae of the phylum Cnidaria. It is the only species in the monotypic genus Periphylla and is one of the rare examples in Scyphozoa which life-cycle lacks a polyp stage. This species is photophobic and inhabits deeper parts of the oceans to avoid light. It may be found at the surface on dark nights.

Description 

The average wet weight of the jellyfish is 540 grams. Overall, helmet jellyfish have a uniform size. They consist 90% of water, the rest being tissue and gelatinous mass, which give the animals their form. They light themselves from within by means of bioluminescence, the red flashes serving as a signal amongst themselves. Between their marginal lobes sit small sense bulbs, by which the helmet jelly can distinguish between light and dark; they have been observed to avoid light. Their nature of avoiding light has given them the title of being photophobic. They have a biochemical content that consists of having a small amount of carbohydrates, average amount of lipids, and a large content of protein. The helmet jellyfish have twelve tentacles that consist of layers of endoderm and mesoglea, but each jellyfish can have a different type of tentacle posture. Through observational studies, it was found that within fifty-one of the observed jellyfish, there were eight different tentacle postures. The two most common type of tentacle postures are straight-extended tentacles with a forty-five degree angle in respect to the oral-aboral body axis, and straight-extended tentacles with a forty-five to ninety degree angle in respect to the oral-aboral body axis. These tentacle postures are how each individual helmet jellyfish swims.

Habitat and behavior 
The jellyfish is found in depths up to 2700 meters and is adapted to its dark environment. Not only have they become adapted and more abundant in darker environments, but they are also found in very opaque and cloudy waters. They are found in these deep and dark waters due to the fact that sunlight can be very harmful to adult helmet jellyfish, and even deadlier to younger helmet jellyfish. The depth that they can be found at varies throughout the day. They're found in abundance at a depth of approximately 13.75 m during the nighttime, and as deep as 150 m during the daytime. The abundance of helmet jellyfish at the depth of 150 m during the day time is nearly three times the abundance of them found during the nighttime. The jellyfish were also seen as far below the surface as 250 m. At this depth, one-third of the total population inhabited the lower water column during daylight while less than 10% were found at the same depths after the sun had gone down. This observation of migration shows that they are constantly migrating vertically throughout the depths of water based on the amount of available sunlight at the given time. However, they can also be seen commonly at different depths depending on their physical size and age. Helmet jellyfish consistently have been found at higher depths, across different locations, if they are smaller in size or are less fit juveniles.

Through their vertical swimming, the jellyfish can swim several different speeds. The majority of their vertical swimming is seen at a speed of <2 cm/s. If they are swimming at full speed they can reach over 10 cm/s, but this is only for a short time span. If they do reach this speed, it is assumed that they follow this with a time of no vertical movement. In 2017, many helmet jellyfish were caught to be studied to determine their main prey. In this experiment it was found that each jellyfish had only an average of five different species of prey in their digestive system. The prey in their digestive system was examined as well as the abundance of the prey. There was a 27% abundance of copepods, 23% abundance of pteropods, 20% abundance of amphipods, 17% abundance of euphausiids, and a 13% abundance of chaetognaths. With a full stomach it turns from the surface back to the depths. Other deep-sea inhabitants feed upon its faeces. They move by swimming with their tentacles being in an aboral position. Their tentacles also have various unique muscles. These include longitudinal, ring-, radial-, and diagonal musculatures. The two most unique are the longitudinal and the diagonal musculature. The longitudinal is used for consuming prey by moving very quickly to the jellyfishes mouth. The diagonal is used for the corkscrew reaction that is used in order to obtain and capture prey.

Reproductive cycle 
Periphylla periphylla represents an exception, very rarely found in the phylum Cnidaria: the medusae do not go through a polyp stage, thus presenting a "holopelagic" life cycle. They also do not undergo an ephyra stage as well as a sessile stage. The helmet jellyfish is also unique in its growth and sexual reproduction in that they are the only known scyphozoan that undergoes sexual propagation but lacks the planula stage. During reproduction, the female helmet jellyfish contain thousands of eggs within their gonads. Their eggs are actually the largest sized eggs within all Cnidaria. Despite the eggs being very large, females will only produce a small number of eggs. The jellyfish release their eggs on the surface of the water, where they rapidly sink to a depth that limits visibility of predators. The medusae release fertilized eggs in open water and these develop directly into medusae, whose development rests entirely upon the egg's high yolk supply. This yolk supply is seen during the first stage of development and is found inside of a network of plasma strains. This is when nuclei dispersed, and many of them are only found during this stage. During the second stage of development a minor indentation is seen. This will then later develop into a mouth. The yolk supply has by then shrunk to only one to two layers above the nucleus. An acid mucus develops through secretion of the endodermal layer. As the jellyfish enters its third stage of development a smooth pit is visible on its anterior end. There is the first indication of a mouth, and their body shape resembles a hat. The amount of yolk granules decrease throughout this stage, and occur in three to four layers. The fourth stage of development shows their “umbrella” to have four indentations which creates the gastric septa on its inside. This stage is when there is the first indication of a histone. As for stage five, there are now sixteen lappets and four rhopalic buds developed. Their medusa shape is much more defined. There is also nearly no yolk present. Stage six of development is when the first glimpse of an opaque jelly is seen. At the end of the hypstome, the cross-shaped mouth is now opened. The seventh stage of development is when they begin to take on their medusa jellyfish shape. They have twelve tentacles as well as four interradial rhopalia. They do not begin to show pigmentation in this stage, but this stage is when cilia is first seen. The final eighth stage is known for when the purple pigmentation of the helmet jellyfish is now seen in their mouth and stomach.

Distribution 
The helmet jelly is found in nearly every ocean of the world, as well as in the Norwegian fjords and in the Mediterranean Sea. The only ocean they are not known to inhabit is the Arctic Ocean. They can also be found in the Iceland and Greenland Seas. Additionally, there has been an increase in their population throughout the northern Barents Sea in recent years. The helmet jellyfish has also been found commonly in Arctic fjords that are located within Lurefjorden and western Spitsbergen, Norway. Their distribution throughout these different locations are greatly influenced by the depths of water, abundance of food sources, and preferred light intensities. Their distribution can also be affected by physical conditions. They have been observed to position themselves further from the surface of the water if there are harsh weather conditions or to avoid too much sunlight. Their distribution can also be affected by water temperature. The vast majority of helmet jellyfish live in temperatures ranging from 4 - 11°C but they are able to survive in water temperatures reaching up to nearly 20°C.

References 

Periphyllidae
Animals described in 1809
Bioluminescent cnidarians
Cosmopolitan animals